Skiple Station is a railway station along the Bergen Line railway line.  It is located at the village of Skiple in the central part of the Raundalen valley in Voss municipality, Vestland county, Norway. The station is served by the Bergen Commuter Rail, operated by Vy Tog, with up to five daily departures in each direction. The station was opened in 1931.

External links
 Jernbaneverket's page on Skiple

Railway stations in Voss
Railway stations on Bergensbanen
Railway stations opened in 1931